Patrick Myzyk (born January 5, 1991) is a Polish figure skater. He is the 2013 and 2015 Polish national champion. He was assigned to the 2015 European Championships in Stockholm, Sweden and qualified for the free skate.

Myzyk was born in Toronto, Ontario, Canada. His mother is from Gdańsk and his father from Toruń.

Programs

Competitive highlights 
CS: Challenger Series

References

External links 
 

1991 births
Polish male single skaters
Living people
Figure skaters from Toronto